For general information about "articles", see Article (disambiguation).
 For the specific use in publishing, see Article (publishing).
 For the concept of "feature stories", or focusing on an issue for in-depth investigation, see feature story.
 For article quality on the English Wikipedia, including featured articles, see English Wikipedia § Wikiproject and assessment.